Teseney Subregion is a subregion in the western Gash-Barka region (Zoba Gash-Barka) of Eritrea. Its capital lies at Teseney.

References
Awate.com: Martyr Statistics

Subregions of Eritrea